José Luis Briones Briseño (born 25 February 1963) is a Mexican politician affiliated with the New Alliance Party. As of 2014 he served as Deputy of the LIX Legislature of the Mexican Congress representing San Luis Potosí (as an independent).

References

1963 births
Living people
Politicians from San Luis Potosí
Members of the Chamber of Deputies (Mexico) for San Luis Potosí
New Alliance Party (Mexico) politicians
21st-century Mexican politicians
Deputies of the LIX Legislature of Mexico